Gunjava was launched at Sulkea in 1826. She was wrecked in December 1827.

On 10 August 1826, Gunjava, C. Oakley, master, sailed from Table Bay, bound for Mauritius. She was carrying a cargo of wheat, sugar, rice, and coffee, and horses. 

On 5 December at Madras a hurricane drove Gunjava, J.Taylor, master, out sea where she foundered. Several other British ships were lost at the same time. The masters, including Taylor, were all ashore.

Citations and references
Citations

References
 

1826 ships
British ships built in India
Age of Sail merchant ships of England
Maritime incidents in December 1827